is a train station in the city of Matsumoto, Nagano Prefecture, Japan, operated by East Japan Railway Company (JR East).

Lines
Shimauchi Station is served by the Ōito Line and is 2.6 kilometers from the terminus of the line at Matsumoto Station.

Station layout
The station consists of one ground-level island platform, connected to the station building by a level crossing. The station is unattended.

Platforms

History
Shimauchi Station opened on 1 November 1915. With the privatization of Japanese National Railways (JNR) on 1 April 1987, the station came under the control of JR East.

Surrounding area
Shimauchi Post Office
Shimauchi Middle School
Shimauchi Elementary School

See also
 List of railway stations in Japan

References

External links

 JR East station information 

Railway stations in Matsumoto City
Ōito Line
Railway stations in Japan opened in 1915
Stations of East Japan Railway Company